Begum Bazaar is the biggest commercial market in Hyderabad, India. It was established during the Qutb Shahi rule. Begum Bazar is located about a half of a kilometer from the Naya Pul bridge in the Old City. It is an old retail and wholesale market for household commodities. Several popular brassware merchants and copper brassware traders are based here.  The bazar is also known for its congestion and heavy traffic. Deals worth crores of rupees are struck daily. It is also famous for spices and the markets nearby Charminar, a historic monument.

Begum Bazar also boasts the second biggest fish market in Hyderabad, only behind the one at Musheerabad.

The adjoining Moazzam Jahi Market is the largest fruit and vegetable market in the city. This market is being slowly replaced by the one at Kothapet, beyond Dilsukhnagar.

It is also close to the historic Osmania General Hospital and the Musi River. The Jumerat Bazaar is specially hosted on Thursdays where all kinds of household commodities are sold. Mangal Bazaar is the main place in Begum Bazaar where  household utensils are sold.

History

The land of Begum Bazaar was gifted to the merchants of Hyderabad by Humda Begum, the wife of His Highness Nizam Ali Khan, Asaf Jah II, for trade and commerce. After developing into a market, this bazaar came to be known as Begum Bazaar.

Transport
The TSRTC buses connect Begum Bazaar with all parts of the city. Afzal Gunj is the nearest bus stop.

The closest MMTS railway station is at Malakpet while the Nampally station is also nearby.
The nearest metro station is MGBS.

Political
Begum Bazaar falls under the Goshamahal Assembly Constituency which is part of Hyderabad's Lok Sabha Seat. T.Raja Singh Lodh is a BJP MLA from Goshamahal (Assembly constituency), Hyderabad.

See also

References

Bazaars
Bazaars in India
Bazaars in Hyderabad, India
Neighbourhoods in Hyderabad, India
Economy of Hyderabad, India